Qian Hu Corporation Limited  is a Singapore-based ornamental fish service provider, with services ranging from the farming, importing, exporting and distribution of ornamental fish, to their specialty of breeding Dragon Fish (aka Arowana). Qian Hu exports more than 500 species and varieties of ornamental fish. It is located at 71 Jalan Lekar, Singapore 698950 off Old Choa Chu Kang Road.

It is a leading and one of the largest ornamental fish exporter, had a 2001 turnover of $22.5 million (in US dollars) and was also the first Singaporean company to achieve the ISO 9002. Other services they offer also include the manufacturing and distribution of more than 5000 types of aquarium and pet accessories locally, as well as worldwide. Singapore exports one-third of the world's ornamental fish and Qian Hu has been a major contributor to this massive trade. It exports fish to more than 45 countries across the globe, with primary markets in Japan, China, Taiwan, the United Kingdom, Germany, France, as well as the rest of Europe and North Asia. Qian Hu has offices and outlets in three other countries: Malaysia, China and Thailand, and hopes to eventually expand its reach even further across the Asian region.

History
The beginnings of Qian Hu go back to the 1980s when Yap Tik Huay, father of current Managing Director Kenny Yap, and Yap Tik Huay's brother, Yap Hey Cha ran a pig farm, rearing pigs as a family business.

During that time, however, the Singapore government was in the midst of making efforts to relocate and eventually wipe out all pig farms in the country not only because of the pollution they were causing, but also to make room for other urban and residential developments.

The Yap family's pig farm was no exception to the government's actions and in 1985, they had no choice but to convert their pig farm into a fish farm. By this time, three of Yap Tik Huay's sons, Yap Peng Heng, Yap Hock Huat and Yap Kim Choon, had begun working in the family business to lend a helping hand. The cubicles that originally penned in pigs were converted to concrete ponds for breeding guppies meant to be sold to local ornamental fish exporters.

In the Great Singapore Flood of 1989, the family's entire stock of over 4000 fish was washed away in a heavy thunderstorm. Left with nothing, the Yaps had to start anew, renaming their family business to hallmark their new beginning. The family business became known as Qian Hu (meaning ‘Thousand Lakes’ in Mandarin) and Kenny Yap, together with his two cousins Andy and Alvin Yap, joined the business in hopes of helping to pull it back up on its feet.

Thus, in 1990, Qian Hu ventured into wholesale, island-wide distribution and began to increase the range and variety of ornamental fish they sold. Aside from the guppies, Koi and Goldfish they sold at that time, fishes from the Chiclid (Discus included) and Gourami families were some of the new varieties introduced. Besides that, Qian Hu also began to manufacture its own accessories in an attempt to branch out its business.

Then, in 1992, Qian Hu eventually began importing ornamental fish and exporting them worldwide, making a name for itself as one of the world's leading exporters of ornamental fish. At the same time, Qian Hu took the opportunity to begin exporting its manufactured aquarium accessories.

On 12 December 1998, the company was incorporated under the Act as Qian Hu Fish Farm Pte Ltd to take over the partnership of Qian Hu Trading and Yi Hu, respectively established in 1988 and 1989.

Qian Hu Corporation Limited was listed on the Singapore Exchange’s (SGX) Stock Exchange of Singapore Dealing and Automated Quotation system (SESDAQ) in the year 2000. By November 2002, it was moved to the Main Board of the Singapore Exchange. In December 2002, Qian Hu was present at the Malaysia International Pet Expo 2002.

in 2006, Thailand newspaper The Nation reported that it did not know whether Qian Hu's activities were considered animal husbandry and fisheries which are prohibited business under the Foreign Business Act of 1999 (Thailand). In 2015, Qian Hu Corporation's head of research of research and development, Alex Chang Kuok Weai, caused controversy when he smuggled 20 bags of live and dead endangered fish in his luggage into Adelaide, Australia.

Branding
Qian Hu’s corporate logo is that of a Chinese high fin banded shark (Myxocyprinus asiaticus), or what the company commonly refers to as a high-fin loach.

The story behind their use of the high-fin loach as their mascot comes not long after the Yap family faced the major setback of having lost their entire crop of guppies to the massive flood in 1989. In an attempt to get the business going again, Qian Hu invested its money in raising high-fin loaches. These fishes, at the time, cost SGD 100 to 200 each for a small specimen and the Yap family had been trying to bring the fish up to the desirable market size in order to sell them at a premium. However, tragedy struck whilst they expanded their premises. The move had caused a ‘shocking wave’ that travelled through the tanks of fish, subsequently killing all the high-fin loaches over a mere span of two to three days. This ‘shocking wave’, was in fact the vibrations given off by the power tools used to install new fish tanks. The family had not known that he fish happened to be highly sensitive to these vibrations. Once again, they were left with nothing but two grim lessons. As Kenny Yap recites time and again in his interviews, the lessons learnt were to not “put all your eggs in one basket” and to remember the importance of knowing a product well before investing in it. Hence, their mascot serves as a reminder to them of the mistakes they had made and to never make the same ones again.

Awards and achievements
Being awarded three ISO 9002s and an ISO 14001 were major achievements for Qian Hu as such awards were firsts for fish farms in Singapore and around the world.

The ISO 9002 certification is given to companies that have outstanding quality management systems. Qian Hu's first ISO 9002 was awarded to Qian Hu Trading in 1996 by SGS Yarsley for their conditioning and packing of their ornamental fish for export.> The second came just a year after that, where Wan Hu division was awarded the ISO 9002 by Bureau Vertitas Quality International for their import and export, breeding, raising and quarantine procedures for the company's prided Dragon Fish.  Then, in 2000, Yi Hu division was awarded the ISO 9002 certification by SGS Yarley for the retail and wholesale of aquarium and pet accessories locally and abroad.

Having learnt from the guppy stock disaster in 1989, Qian Hu had their 42-hectare premises landscaped to avoid the overflowing of ponds and tanks that held their valuable stocks of fish. Runoffs of rainwater are collected and recycled for use in the ponds, tanks and even toilets. This one-of-a-kind system that reuses and recycles water was what earned Qian Hu the ISO 14001 certification. The ISO 14001 is awarded to companies that have excellent environmental management systems.

Some of Qian Hu's many titles, awards and achievements include being the “first small-cap company in Singapore to win a best managed board award” and two Singapore corporate awards: Best Investor Relationship and Gold Medal in Annual Report.

References

External links
investing.businessweek.com
finance.google.com

Singaporean brands